Rosa Panduro District is a district of the Putumayo Province in Peru, and one of the four districts that comprise that province.

History 
Rosa Panduro was part of Maynas Province until April 17, 2014 when it was created as District by Law N° 30186 as part of Putumayo Province. The district is named after a housewife who participated in the Ecuadorian–Peruvian War.

Geography
The district has a total land area of 7 155,65 km². Its administrative center is located 34 meters above sea level.

Boundaries 
 By the north: Teniente Manuel Clavero District; 
 By the est: Colombia Republic;
 By the south and sudwest: Putumayo District and, Napo District and Torres Causana District (Maynas Province).

Authorities 
The current mayor of the district is Delmer Ricopa Coquinche (Movimiento Integración Loretana).

See also 
 Administrative divisions of Peru

References

External links
 Municipalidad Distrital de Rosa Panduro - City council official website (in Spanish)
 INEI Peru (in Spanish)

Districts of the Loreto Region
Districts of the Putumayo Province